DSLReports is a North American-oriented broadband information and review site based in New York City. The site's main focus is on internet, phone, cable TV, fiber optics, and wireless services in the United States and Canada, as well as other countries (United Kingdom and Australia).

DSLReports was created by Justin Beech in June 1999. According to Alexa's page ranking system and the WHOIS, dslreports.com's domain URL was registered on May 28, 1999.

History

"Broadband Reports" 
In the 2000s, DSLReports was concurrently branded as "BroadbandReports.com," a domain that now redirects to dslreports.com.

2011 SQL Injection attack 
Over a four-hour period on April 27, 2011, an automated SQL Injection attack occurred on the DSLReports website. The attack was able to extract 8% of the site's username/password pairs, which amounted to approximately 8,000 of the 9,000 active accounts and 90,000 old or inactive accounts created during the site's 10-year history. Once the intrusion was detected, stopped and the extent of the compromised accounts had been assessed, passwords for those accounts were automatically reset.

Content 
DSLReports rates and reviews cable, DSL and fiber optic internet services from providers all over North America. The site also runs support and discussion forums and offers online tools for testing internet connection.

Reviews 
DSLReports allows its users to submit reviews of their Internet service provider (ISP), Web hosting service, digital phone service (VOIP), and more. Users may also read reviews written by others. Many large ISPs have over a thousand reviews on the site. Reviews may be filtered for the user's location and/or connectivity preference.

News 
The site is a source of internet related news and opinion, and occasionally breaks stories about broadband internet service providers, such as Time Warner Cable's 2008 decision to test consumption-based billing with subscribers. That same year, when Charter Communications began sending letters to high-speed internet customers regarding a new website tracking policy, reports of the letters first appeared on DSLReports. DSLReport's editors post Internet-related news and opinion items on the site's front page throughout the day. Common topics of news items and features include wireless technologies, peer-to-peer file sharing, upgrades and new offerings from ISPs, legal issues, regulatory issues, and security issues. However, since July 2, 2018, the site has not published new articles, as its main editor, Karl Bode, was laid off due to funding. However, compilations of links to articles on other sites are published every weekday.

Tools 
DSLReports is reported to have the most comprehensive package of internet and connection testing tools available.

Speed tests 
The DSLReports speed test claims to be the best speed test and the first popular speed test. The speed test uses HTML5.

Ping tests 
DSLReports does have a ping and jitter test.

Other tests and tools 
Other tools include stream tests, line monitoring, tweak testing, packet loss testing, and many other tools. Some of these services are provided free of charge, but others require the user to purchase "tool points", which are approximately $1.

Community
DSLReports operates over 200 forums, many of which focus on Internet and computer-related topics. Other forums are dedicated to general conversation, political discussions, do-it-yourself projects or regional discussions. There are over a 1.8 million total registered users on the DSLReports forums. A discussion forum is automatically created for every news and opinion article posted on the front page, which allows members to discuss the article in question. Although membership is free, the forum community allows for anonymous posting so the information or source in [anonymous] posts may be questionable as compared to posts made by actual frequent members of the site. There are also well hidden private invitation and very controversial forums such as the "meatlocker" which can be seen by adding the /forums/meatlocker suffix to he website address. It is said this private area is for nude and pornographic material submitted by the moderators and special guests.

Robb Topolski, a software tester whose findings and subsequent political activities have contributed to the movement for net neutrality has contributed to the site.

Influence 
DSLReports has been written about or had their reports featured in CNN, USA Today, Forbes, NBC News, The Washington Post, The New York Times and Ars Technica, among others.

The site has been described by The Washington Post as a "comprehensive reference" for internet services. Discussion topics on the DSLReports frequently generate thousands of comments. The Associated Press reported that over 5,000 messages were posted to forum discussing a potential data cap imposed upon Comcast Corp. customers in 2003.

CNN has rated DSLReports as one of the best free online services.

References

External links 

American review websites
Internet forums
Technology websites
Consumer guides
Recommender systems
Companies based in New York City
Internet properties established in 1999
1999 establishments in New York (state)